Lütau is a village in the district of Lauenburg, in Schleswig-Holstein, Germany. It is situated approximately 7 km north of Lauenburg/Elbe, and 40 km east of Hamburg.

Lütau is part of the Amt ("collective municipality") Lütau. The seat of the Amt is in Lauenburg/Elbe.

References

Herzogtum Lauenburg